The Albert Neal Durden House, also known as the Durden-Brinson-Brewer House, is located in Emanuel County, Georgia near Twin City, Georgia.

The house consists of a Plantation plain-style house built around 1870, plus a hall-parlor house from the 1850s, joined by an enclosed walkway. It was built to serve as a home for Albert Neal and Eliza Brinson Durden and, up to 1990 had been lived in by descendants.  Along with outbuildings, it is on a  property which was the heart of a larger plantation.  The older house was moved to its present location and the newer one was built in front of it.

References

Houses on the National Register of Historic Places in Georgia (U.S. state)
Houses in Emanuel County, Georgia
Houses completed in 1870
National Register of Historic Places in Emanuel County, Georgia